Ajitpal Mangat  is an Indian film director.

Early life

Mangat was born in Bhagalpur, Bihar. He is one of the most famous Indian ad film maker. In 2008, he moved to Movie direction with his 1st movie "Victory".

Film career 

Ajitpal Mangat's latest movie was Victory (2009), a cricket-based sports film starring Harman Baweja, Amrita Rao and Anupam Kher. It was Harman Baweja's second release after his debut film Love Story 2050. He has Produced and Directed over 500 TV commercials
Directed 7 TV series and TV shows.

Filmography

 Indrajeet (1991) (Acted as Ajit Kumar; credited as Ajitpal)
 Khatarnaak (1990) (Acted as Yogesh Kothari; credited as Ajitpal)
 Hamari Shaadi (1990) (Actor; credited as Ajit Pal)
 Victory (2009) (Director)

References

External links 
 

People from Bhagalpur
Living people
Male actors in Hindi cinema
Male actors from Bihar
20th-century Indian male actors
Film directors from Bihar
Hindi-language film directors
Year of birth missing (living people)